Sickler is a surname. It may refer to:
Brett Sickler (born 1983), American rower
Don Sickler (born 1944), American jazz trumpeter, arranger, and producer
George Sickler (1891–1964), South African cricket umpire

English-language surnames
Surnames of English origin